Moritz Lanegger (born 29 March 1990) is an Austrian professional basketball player for the Vienna DC Timberwolves of the Austrian Basketball Superliga. Lanegger is also a member of the Austrian national team. He plays the point guard position.

Professional career
Lanegger started his career in 2006 with Kapfenberg Bulls. In 2011 he signed with Xion Dukes Klosterneuburg. In his second year there, he won his first Austrian championship. In August 2015, Lanegger signed with reigning Austrian champions Güssing Knights.
On January 29, 2018, Lanegger signed with CB Bahía San Agustín out of Palma, Spain. He played for the Klosterneuburg Dukes from 2018 to 2020. On December 28, 2021, Lanegger signed with the Vienna DC Timberwolves.

Honours
Austrian Championship (1): 2012
Austrian Cup (1): 2013
Austrian Supercup (2): 2012, 2013
Danish Cup (1): 2017
Individual awards:
ABL Austrian MVP (1): 2013

Austrian national team
Lanegger plays for the Austrian national team since 2011.
He has also been a part of the country's 3x3 national team.

References

External links

Profile at eurobasket.com

1990 births
Living people
Austrian expatriate sportspeople in Denmark
Austrian expatriate sportspeople in England
Austrian expatriate sportspeople in Spain
Austrian men's basketball players
 Kapfenberg Bulls players
 Point guards
 Sportspeople from Graz
London Lions (basketball) players
Xion Dukes Klosterneuburg players
 UBC Güssing Knights players
 Team FOG Næstved players
CB Bahía San Agustín players
Austrian expatriate basketball people